The 2021–22 North American winter was not as significant and record-breaking as the previous winter season. Despite this, several notable and significant events still occurred, including two separate record-breaking tornado outbreaks in mid-December, a significant winter storm in the South in mid-January, a powerful blizzard that impacted the Northeast coast at the end of January and a wide-ranging, significant winter storm that affected most of the eastern half of the country in early February. Additional significant events included a late-season winter storm in March that affected the Appalachian Mountains, and a major blizzard that affected North and South Dakota in mid-April. Addiitonally, a very late out-of-season snowstorm struck the Rocky Mountains in late May. During the season, four storms have been ranked on the Regional Snowfall Index (RSI), although none attained the “Major” category. Similar to the previous winter, a developing La Niña was expected to influence weather patterns across the continent.

Based on the astronomical definition, winter began on the winter solstice on December 21, 2021 and ended on the spring equinox on March 20, 2022. Based on the meteorological definition, the first day of winter started on December 1 and the last day was February 28. These dates historically describe the period in each year when winter storms are most likely to occur. However, winter storms may occur outside of these limits, as shown by the early formation of this season's mid-October winter storm on October 12. Since both definitions of winter span the start of the calendar year, it is possible to have a winter storm spanning two different years. In addition, major winter events can occur well after the official start of spring, as close as June in some cases, as shown by a very late-season winter storm that impacted Colorado in late May 2022 with heavy snow following warm temperatures just a day beforehand.



Seasonal forecasts

On October 13, 2021, The Weather Channel (TWC) released its U.S. winter temperature outlooks for the 2021–22 winter season. The forecasts reflected the likelihood of a weak La Niña pattern and weak polar vortex during much of the season. Overall for the winter, significantly above-average temperatures were forecast for most of the Southern Tier, with near-average temperatures in the Central and much of the Northeastern United States. Slightly below-average temperatures were expected in most of the north-central and northwestern U.S. During the first half of the season, a relatively weak La Niña was expected to result in widespread below-average temperatures across the northern half of the country, with widespread above-average temperatures in the southern half. However, as both the La Niña and polar vortex were expected to strengthen later in the season, widespread above-average temperatures were forecast in most of the U.S. during the latter half of the winter, especially in the South and East. Below-average temperatures were still expected to continue in the far Northwestern U.S.

On October 21, 2021, the National Oceanic and Atmospheric Administration's Climate Prediction Center released its U.S. Winter Outlook for the upcoming winter. The temperature and precipitation outlooks reflected a typical La Niña weather pattern during the winter. Significantly above-average temperatures were forecasted across the Southern Tier, especially in the Southeast, with slightly above-average temperatures forecast in the Ohio Valley and Northeast. Near to below-average temperatures were expected in the far northwestern U.S. Below-average precipitation was expected across the far Southern Tier, with particularly in the Southwest, with above-average precipitation forecast in the far Northwestwern U.S., as well as the Ohio Valley and surrounding regions. Near-average precipitation was expected in the Central U.S., Northern Plains, and Northeast. Drought was forecasted to improve and end in the Pacific Northwest, while it was expected to develop or worsen across the Southwest. Drought was not expected in the eastern half of the country.

Seasonal summary

The system was estimated to have caused at least $50 million in damages. After a one-month break in winter weather events due to unfavorable conditions for winter storms, a blizzard began to develop across south-central Canada and the Upper Midwest on November 11. December 2021 saw a record warm month across the Lower 48. Ten states (New Mexico, Texas, Louisiana, Mississippi, Alabama, Oklahoma, Arkansas, Missouri, Kansas, and Nebraska) saw record warm December's. An early December heat wave set all-time record highs in Montana, Washington, Wyoming, and North Dakota. In early-to-mid December, a major system produced a historic tornado outbreak along with wintry weather in the Upper Midwest, followed by another powerful storm that produced an ever larger tornado outbreak along with strong winds across the High Plains just a few days later. The storm, being a category 3 atmospheric river event, brought heavy rain and snowfall to the Western United States. Over  of rain during the storm were recorded on Mount Tamalpais, a mountain in the San Francisco Bay Area, with San Francisco itself receiving around two inches of rain from the event. Around  of snow was recorded in Pinecrest, California. The storm caused statewide snowpack in California to increase from 19% of normal to 83% of normal.

Later that month and into early January, a series of winter storms brought a cold snap and heavy snowfall to parts of the West Coast, particularly areas in the Pacific Northwest region. This became Seattle’s coldest day in 31 years, because the high for the day was only . With five days of snow in a row, Seattle saw the most consecutive snowy days on record since 1969. Another storm on January 6 led to the closure of several mountain passes in the Cascade Range, leaving only one east–west route across Washington. Snoqualmie Pass reopened to limited traffic four days later.

Before additional snow events occurred throughout January, with below-average temperatures being common, Falcon Lake, Texas, set a record
One such storm in January was the a significant winter storm in the eastern half of the country in mid-January with snow and ice, causing Georgia, Virginia, North Carolina and South Carolina to all declare a state of emergency in preparation for the winter storm. The most significant event occurred at the end of the month, when a major blizzard struck the Northeastern United States on January 28–29. Blizzard conditions were confirmed at multiple locations in New England, including Providence, Boston, and Worcester, in addition to some areas on the Jersey Shore receiving blizzard conditions. In early February, another major winter storm affected the country, with areas as far south as Texas to as far north as Maine receiving significant snowfall, though in the former it was not as bad as the previous year's storm which crippled the state's power grid.

The last significant event occurred in late May after a record-late snowstorm struck Colorado just days after temperatures had been near . However, on June 19, 2022, a hiker died due to hypothermia in Maine, and temperatures below freezing were recorded that morning in Canaan Valley in West Virginia, Mount Washington in New Hampshire, and Waverly, New York.

Events

Mid-October winter storm

On October 10 at 03:00 UTC, an extratropical cyclone made landfall near Vancouver. This cyclone's remnants became a weak, elongated frontal system over the interior West Coast by October 11 at 12:00 UTC. After remaining disorganized for about 12 hours, the system began to coalesce into a stronger extratropical cyclone over Colorado on October 12. It also began to drop snow over parts of the Rocky Mountains by this point. The system then merged into a well-formed extratropical cyclone with a single-low pressure center by early the next day, beginning to steadily intensify. Snowfall rates began to rapidly increase in bands to the west of the center throughout the day, with up to a foot of snow falling within hours. The extratropical cyclone then began to accelerate to the north, becoming occluded in the process. The weakening system then moved into the Canadian Prairies, resulting in some more snow there, before merging into another frontal system on October 15.

The precursor to the system resulted in blizzard conditions across parts of northeastern Utah on October 11, disrupting a 50-mile ultramarathon occurring there. Extremely heavy snowfall rates and winds gusting to tropical storm-force resulted in the race being called off, and over 87 rescues had to be made in the snow. Additionally, hurricane-force wind gusts were recorded across parts of eastern Colorado and western South Dakota, with a  gust occurring in Wasta. Larger cities such as Billings and Bozeman also saw  of snow from the system. As the system moved into south-central Canada later that day, it also resulted in some light snowfall there before the system dissipated the next day. According to Aon Benfield, the system was estimated to have caused at least $50 million (2021 USD) in damages.

Late October West Coast bomb cyclone

In late October 2021, a powerful bomb cyclone struck the Western United States and Western Canada, bringing severe impacts to the region. The cyclone tapped into a large atmospheric river and underwent explosive intensification, becoming a bomb cyclone on October 24. The system had severe impacts across Western North America, before dissipating on October 26. The storm shattered multiple pressure records across parts of the Pacific Northwest. Additionally, the bomb cyclone was the most powerful storm on record to strike the region, in terms of minimum central pressure. The bomb cyclone brought powerful gale-force winds and flooding to portions of Western North America. At its height, the storm cut the power to over 370,500 customers across the Western U.S. and British Columbia. The storm killed at least two people; damage from the storm was estimated at four hundred million dollars (2021 USD). The bomb cyclone was compared to the Columbus Day Storm of 1962, in terms of ferocity.

Mid-December storm complex

In mid-December, a large storm complex produced a devastating tornado outbreak in the South. On the wintry side, a prolific snowstorm occurred within the Plains and Upper Midwest, entering the Western United States on December 9. The storm brought the first measurable snowfall of the rainy season to Utah.

Minneapolis and St. Paul each declared snow emergencies. In the Twin Cities, Metro Transit reported that half of its busses were delayed. More than 250 flights were canceled at Minneapolis–Saint Paul International Airport. Near Faribault, a seven-car pileup occurred on Interstate 35. Minnesota State Patrol reported 232 crashes, causing 19 injuries. The National Weather Service issued winter storm warnings for part of Minnesota during the December 10.

Early January nor'easters

First storm (January 3–4)

A nor'easter exited the east coast of the United States on January 4, producing snowfall from Alabama to New England, with as much as  accumulating in Huntsville, Alabama and  falling at Ronald Reagan Washington National Airport. Many vehicles and motorists across Interstate 95 in Virginia were stranded due to the snow, with some of them for 24 hours. Over 1,000 motor crashes were also reported and assisted by the state's police. It also caused 3 people to die in a car crash in Maryland. Two others died in the winter storm, one each in Tennessee and Georgia, bringing the total up to 5. Thousands of flights were canceled in the eastern United States. The winter storm was unofficially named Winter Storm Frida by The Weather Channel. It also caused 343,000 power outages in Virginia and 42,000 in Maryland. North-central, northeast and northwest portions of Georgia were placed under winter storm warnings by the National Weather Service there on 1 January. Some of the areas of the state also saw power outages. Winter alerts were also placed over some areas of the state. Over 59,000 household customers lost electricity across Charlotte City, with 159,000 overall over the Carolinas. Some establishments were completely wrecked by the strong winds the storm brought, and trees were reported to have been downed. This further rose to 211,000 by 3 January and lessened to 2,500 as rescue teams started working to restore electricity. In Ellendale, Delaware,  of snow fell on 3 January. This led to a chicken house collapse on 4 January which trapped a 12-year-old girl. The notable thing about this nor'easter was, it struck with very little warning, and produced little to no snow north of Philadelphia and Toms River, New Jersey. According to Aon Bonfield, damage from the storm reached $495 million.

Farther north, in Iceland, news about the storm were dispatched across the country's people as a preparation. The south and western parts of Iceland were also placed under an orange warning by the Icelandic Meteorological Office by 5 January. The Icelandic Coast Guard also alerted vessels and fishermen in ports regarding the brunt of it. Icelandair also canceled some flight operations by that day owing to the storm. In the southwest portion of the country, rescue teams were reported to have been responding to the calls by the citizens there regarding the impact of the storm. Across Reykjavík, they responded to flying roofs of different houses and establishments. Suðurnes (Southern Peninsula) and Vestmannaeyjar (Westman Islands) were also severely affected. A hut was also blown away by strong winds in Vatnsleysuströnd. The country's eastern portion meanwhile, was battered by rough waves from the storm. Harbours at Hafnarhólmur sustained "biggest" damages, as well as some vessels docked there. Rocks from the shores also pushed over the area's roadways; this was cleaned up subsequently.

Second storm (January 4–7)

A winter storm, unofficially named Winter Storm Garrett by The Weather Channel impacted the Ohio Valley and Northeastern United States starting on January 6. The storm dropped nearly ten inches of snow on Lexington, Kentucky, causing 250 car crashes which led to 18 injuries. Portions of Interstate 64 closed down. Nashville saw , which is more than an average years winter. Snow fell at two inches per hour. Freezing rain also fell in the Memphis metropolitan area. The storm also dropped 6+ inches of snow on the eastern New York metropolitan area, with the city center receiving . Meanwhile, parts of the Philadelphia metro area saw  of snow.

January cold wave

Throughout the month of January, temperatures frequently were below-average in much of the Eastern United States. On January 11, the coldest air in 3 years came down on the Northeastern United States. The Interstate 95 corridor had wind chills dip below , while it dipped in the -30s Fahrenheit in interior New York and Maine. On January 15, the cold wave strengthened, giving New York City the coldest day of the year, with a high of only  and a low of only , making the low the coldest reading in Central Park since January 31st, 2019. In Syracuse, New York, the high was only . On January 21, an incident happened in a lake in Queens, NY when two people fell in the frozen lake, whereas the FDNY attempted to rescue the people that were stuck in the lake while using cold water gear. Syracuse saw 8 days below , the most in 7 years. Parts of Cuba get as low as  early on January 31. January 2022 became the fifth coldest January in record at Covington, Virginia.

Mid-January winter storm

A weak area of low pressure developed on January 13 in southwestern Canada, moving southeastwards into the High Plains while delivering heavy snowfall and began moving more southwards through the states of Nebraska, Kansas and Missouri into the early morning hours of January 14. Later that day, at 21:00 UTC the Weather Prediction Center (WPC) began issuing periodic storm summary bulletins on the developing system, albeit with competing areas of low pressure. Moving further south, a stronger low began forming over southern Missouri on January 15, moving into Arkansas and began strengthening due to a strong upper-level low located nearby. Associated cold air in place over the aforementioned areas allowed snow to break out in areas further south, as the system began occluding later that night while wintry precipitation spread eastward towards the Southeastern United States into the early morning hours of January 16. The system began turning more northward later that day into the southern Appalachian Mountains as the two centers began merging.

The storm, unofficially named Winter Storm Izzy by The Weather Channel, caused  of snow in Laurens, Iowa. There were also 78 car crashes reported, which caused 14 injures. Georgia, Virginia, North Carolina and South Carolina all declared a state of emergency in preparation for the winter storm.

Late January Southeast snowstorm 

A winter storm, unofficially named Winter Storm Jasper by The Weather Channel impacted the southeastern United States in mid-to-late January and killed one person in North Carolina when an ambulance slid off the road. The storm resulted in freezing rain, sleet, and snow across the Carolinas. The storm also closed hundreds of schools in Florida and Louisiana. In Pennsylvania, a Winter storm warning was issued in Pittsburgh and snow fell there as well.

Late January blizzard

A blizzard, unofficially named Winter Storm Kenan by The Weather Channel caused widespread and significant conditions on the East Coast of the United States from January 27–30.

Winter storm warnings and blizzard warnings were issued for large swaths of the Northeast and New England, as blizzard conditions were expected to occur closer to the coastal areas of the region. Approximately 1,200 flights nationwide were cancelled ahead of the storm. New York governor Kathy Hochul on January 28 urged residents, particularly those further east in the Long Island region, to prepare for high winds, power outages and near-blizzard conditions. People were also urged to not travel at the height of the storm. Hochul also ordered that state emergency assets be ready in case the system tracked further west. A "snow alert" was declared in New York City by the New York Department of Sanitation that day as well. On Long Island, Public Service Enterprise Group crews worked to cut tree branches in order to prevent power outages from snow weighing down on the branches and breaking. In New Jersey, major roadways such as Interstate 95 and Interstate 78 were being brined by the New Jersey Department of Transportation since January 26. The agency also stated that potential drivers should check their car settings and be prepared should the urgent need to travel arise. Officials in Atlantic City announced a parking ban would go into effect at 5 p.m. on January 28, in addition to opening shelters. Early on January 28, a Blizzard Warning was issued for Rhode Island and eastern Massachusetts. The state of Virginia declared a state of emergency on January 27 in preparation for the storm system.

Blizzard conditions were confirmed at multiple locations in New England, including Providence, Boston, and Worcester.

Early February winter storm

A widespread, damaging and severe winter storm affected a wide swath of most of the United States with widespread wintry precipitation, spreading from Texas all the way northeast to Maine in early February 2022. Nineteen states in the U.S. received impacts from the system, with more than 90 million people that were in the storm's path. The winter storm was unofficially named Winter Storm Landon by The Weather Channel and was also referred to by other media outlets as the Groundhog Snowstorm, primarily due to the storm impacting on Groundhog Day.
The National Weather Service issued winter storm watches from Wyoming to Maine. Winter Storm Warnings were also issued from New Mexico to Maine, and at least 18 states were under winter storm warnings. In northeastern Ohio, and Buffalo, New York, snow amounts of more than a foot were forecasted. Amtrak cancelled or modified the routes several trains due to the storm.

Due to wintry conditions across Dallas, Texas, Dallas/Fort Worth International Airport was closed on February 3. 1 person was killed in Dallas, primarily when a semi-truck crashed while traveling on I-45 while traveling over I-30, an additional dog died in the crash as well. Three inches of snow were reported in Nashville, Tennessee, as well as 2 additional inches in Little Rock, Arkansas and Mayfield, Kentucky. Over 120,000 people lost power in Shelby County, Tennessee. On I-10 near Kerrville, Texas, several semi-trucks were jackknifed, causing drivers to be stranded on the interstate for hours.  A truck driver died on I-35 in Oklahoma after losing control on an icy part of the road.  A person in Oklahoma died after crashing in an ATV on a snow-covered road. Ice impacts reached as far south as Corpus Christi, Texas.

Late February winter storm 
A very large winter storm affected 265 million people towards the end of February. Portions of Interstate 5 in California were closed as a result of the snow. A fatal car crash in Tennessee killed one person. There was also a child who died on a frozen bridge in Kentucky. There were also 52 injuries in Missouri due to a combined 402 car crashes. 33,000 customers in Arkansas, and 15,000 in Tennessee lost power. The Missouri car crashes caused 4 deaths. Bath, Pennsylvania saw  of freezing rain, while Mooers, New York had  of snow, Madison, New Hampshire had  of snow, and Boston had  of snow. A seventh fatality occurred in a 30 car pileup on Interstate 89 in Milton, Vermont.

Mid-March winter storm and cold wave 
A winter storm developed on March 9 as a shortwave trough over the High Plains and Midwest before moving eastward and dropping moderate to heavy accumulations across the region from March 9–10. It was unofficially named “Winter Storm Quinlan” by the Weather Channel. Over 143,000 customers lost power. Snow even fell as far south as Louisiana and Mississippi, but quickly melted. High winds at High Point Monument reached , faster then any gust during Hurricane Sandy at that location, while in Ocala, Florida, a tornado touched down, which was rated EF1.

Parts of Wisconsin reached .

Late March Northeast cold snap 
A rare springtime cold wave affected the Northeastern United States at the end of March, following an arctic front moving in the night of March 27 into the morning of March 28. Hamilton, Ontario had its coldest high since 1923, at only . In Massachusetts, Boston tied a record low high of only , and in Worcester, it only reached , one degree below the previous record. The wind chill high in Toronto only reached , and the actual high only hit . Despite this, the cold wave also brought a snow squall, which, in Schuylkill County, Pennsylvania, caused a car crash on Interstate 81, killing 6 people, and causing 24 motorists to be transported to hospitals. Despite 15 snow squall warnings being issued, none were issued in the area of the crash due a gap in radar coverage. Then lieutenant governor and current senator John Fetterman tweeted out his condolences to the people affected in the crash and his gratitude to the first responders who dealt with the situation that day. The cold lingered into March 29, when Boston had a high of only . Record lows stretched as far west as Youngstown, Ohio where a record low of  occurred. However, severe storms ended the cold snap by March 31.

Mid-April blizzard 

On April 12, 2022, the National Hockey League announced that the upcoming Winnipeg Jets game against the Seattle Kraken, which was originally scheduled for April 13, has been postponed to May 1 as a winter storm swept through the southern area of Manitoba. On April 13, a video is released of cattle in Douglas huddling together in the storm to protect their calves. Several locations in Montana also had record low conditions across April 12 and 13. The storm caused Billings, Montana recorded their snowiest April day since 1955. Pony, Montana saw  of snow. The blizzard caused Interstate 94 to be shut down between Jamestown, North Dakota and Glendive, Montana, US Route 83 to be closed from Bismarck, North Dakota to Minot, North Dakota, and US Route 85 to be closed from the South Dakota border to Amidon, North Dakota. There was one fatality due to the blizzard in North Dakota.

Mid-April nor'easter

Beginning early on April 18, a nor'easter began developing off the Southeastern United States, bringing heavy rain, wind and coastal flooding to much of the Mid-Atlantic states. In Annapolis, Maryland, a tree fell on a home, killing a person and injuring three others. Between 3am and 9am, heavy rain on the Major Deegan Expressway caused all the southbound lanes to shut down. Over 300,000 customers in the Northeast lost power, including 200,000 in New York. Virgil, New York saw  of snow, while Montrose, Pennsylvania saw  of snow. Binghamton, which saw , realized its largest April snowstorm on record. From 12:30am to 4am on April 19, the NWS office in Boston lost power. The MLB game at Citi Field between the New York Mets and San Francisco Giants was postponed as the system passed through. According to Aon Benfield, damage was $25 million.

Late May winter storm
A very late-season winter storm, unofficially named Winter Storm Tad by The Weather Channel, affected the state of Colorado on May 20–21, 2022. Some areas even received their heaviest snowfall for the month of May as a result, although Denver did not see a record-breaking amount. The winter storm followed on the heels of a large temperature drop throughout the state, following temperatures of near  the day before, with some areas like Denver seeing a 50 °F (28 °C) drop in that timeframe. The winter storm caused 100,000 customers to lose power. In addition, over 600 flights were delayed and over 300 more were cancelled. The low on May 21 in Denver was a record tying . The second half of May was the coldest since 1951 in the area. An MLB game between the New York Mets and the Colorado Rockies was postponed due to the intolerable conditions.

Related events

Late October nor'easter

A strong nor'easter in late October brought high winds, cutting power to more than 600,000 people in New England.

A plane was damaged at the New Bedford Regional Airport after being blown off the runway. In Hingham, a large tree brought down wires. According to Aon Benfield, damage was estimated at over $200 million (2021 USD). The system would later move out to sea and acquire subtropical characteristics, becoming Subtropical Storm Wanda on October 31, later becoming a full-fledged tropical cyclone two days later. The precursor of Wanda caused a lot of flooding in the tri-state area with heavy amounts of rain, which killed two people.

Season effects
This is a table of all of the events that have occurred in the 2021–22 North American winter. It includes their duration, damage, impacted locations, and death totals. Deaths in parentheses are additional and indirect (an example of an indirect death would be a traffic accident), but were still related to that storm. All of the damage figures are in 2022 USD.

See also

List of major snow and ice events in the United States
Winter storm
2021–22 European windstorm season
Tornadoes of 2021
Weather of 2021
Weather of 2022

References

External links

 Winter Storm Forecast Tracks from the Weather Prediction Center
 2021 Storm Summaries from the Weather Prediction Center
 2022 Storm Summaries from the Weather Prediction Center
 Event Reviews from the Weather Prediction Center

 
2021 meteorology
2022 meteorology
2021 in North America
2022 in North America
North American winters